Robert Adam Nisbet-Hamilton PC, FRS, JP (1804 – 9 June 1877), known as Robert Dundas until 1835 and as Robert Christopher between 1835 and 1855, was a British Conservative Party politician. He served as Chancellor of the Duchy of Lancaster under the Earl of Derby between March and December 1852.

Background
Born Robert Dundas, he was the eldest son of Philip Dundas (c.1763–1807, the fourth son of Robert Dundas of Arniston, the younger), and Margaret (daughter of John Wedderburn of Ballendean (1729–1803) and sister of Sir David Wedderburn, 7th Baronet (1775–1858)).

He assumed the surname of Christopher in lieu of his patronymic in 1835 when his wife Lady Mary Bruce (see below) inherited the Christopher estates at Bloxholm and Wellvale in Lincolnshire. In 1855 he assumed the surname of Nisbet-Hamilton in lieu of Christopher after his wife succeeded to the Nisbet-Hamilton estates in Scotland, including Dirleton Castle and Archerfield House.

General Robert Manners left Bloxholm to his brother George, High Sheriff of Lincolnshire in 1826, whose death occurred in 1828.  Both brothers having died unmarried, George left the estate to their dearest cousin, Mrs Jenney.  She was the daughter of John, second Duke of Rutland, and sister of Lord Robert Manners, the father of Robert and George, making her their first cousin, once removed.  However, Lady Mary Bruce, who was the brothers’ great niece, and eldest daughter of the 7th Earl of Elgin, contested the will, saying George had changed his will in her favour, and took the matter to court.  A relative of the brothers wrote to the Editor of the Stamford Mercury on 26 March 1841 making it very clear that the family knew George wanted Bloxholm to go to Mrs Jenney, writing: for it is the opinion of all who are acquainted with the circumstances, that the testator would never have made an alteration had he been in the full possession of his faculties. The  matter was settled in favour of Lady Mary Bruce.

Political career
After a successful electoral petition against the General Election result Nisbet-Hamilton was returned to Parliament for Ipswich in 1827, a seat he held until 1831 and again briefly in 1835. He also represented Edinburgh between 1831 and 1832 and North Lincolnshire between 1837 and 1857. When the Conservatives came to power under the Earl of Derby in 1852, Nisbet-Hamilton was appointed Chancellor of the Duchy of Lancaster and sworn of the Privy Council. He remained as Chancellor of the Duchy of Lancaster until the government fell in December 1852.

In 1833 he was elected a Fellow of the Royal Society.

Family
Nisbet-Hamilton married Lady Mary, daughter of General Thomas Bruce, 7th Earl of Elgin and Mary, daughter and heiress of William Hamilton Nisbet, in 1828. They had one daughter. Nisbet-Hamilton died in June 1877, Lady Mary survived him by six years, dying in December 1883.

Notes

References

External links
Portrait of Robert Nisbet-Hamilton at the National Portrait Gallery

External links 
 

1804 births
1877 deaths
Conservative Party (UK) MPs for English constituencies
Members of the Parliament of the United Kingdom for Edinburgh constituencies
Scottish Tory MPs (pre-1912)
Chancellors of the Duchy of Lancaster
UK MPs 1826–1830
UK MPs 1830–1831
UK MPs 1831–1832
UK MPs 1832–1835
UK MPs 1837–1841
UK MPs 1841–1847
UK MPs 1847–1852
UK MPs 1852–1857
Robert Nisbet-Hamilton
Fellows of the Royal Society
Members of the Parliament of the United Kingdom for Ipswich
Members of the Privy Council of the United Kingdom